Corey Gatewood played both wide receiver and cornerback at Stanford University. He was signed by the Minnesota Vikings as an undrafted free agent cornerback in 2012.  On August 25, 2012, he was released by the Vikings.
He was the number one receiver coming out of highschool from the state of Massachusetts.

References

Year of birth missing (living people)
Living people
American football wide receivers
American football cornerbacks
Stanford Cardinal football players
Players of American football from Massachusetts
African-American players of American football
21st-century African-American people